Vidovdan (lit. "Saint Vitus Day") is a Serbian national and religious holiday, a slava (feast day) celebrated on 28 June (Gregorian calendar), or 15 June according to the Julian calendar. The Serbian Church designates it as the memorial day to Saint Prince Lazar and the Serbian holy martyrs who fell during the Battle of Kosovo against the Ottoman Empire on 15 June 1389 (according to the Julian calendar). It is an important part of Serb ethnic and Serbian national identity.

History

Vidovdan (Saint Vitus Day) is celebrated on June 28 and is considered a sacred holiday for Serbs as several important events are linked to the date. 

The day became highly regarded by Serbs after the fourteenth century when the Battle of Kosovo took place on Saint Vitus Day in 1389. A Serb-led Christian coalition by Prince Lazar fought the Ottoman army on the Kosovo field. Although the battle itself was inconclusive, and both Sultan Murad and Prince Lazar were slain, it led to the Ottoman conquest of Serbian principalities. After the Great Migrations of the Serbs in 1690, Vidovdan became a day to honor those who fought in the battle and fell "for their faith and homeland". The holiday was institutionalized by the church in 1849 and politically and publicly first celebrated in 1851 as a representation of the struggle for Serbian freedom from Ottoman subjection. It slowly achieved popularity with the growth of national identities in Europe in the nineteenth century and came to be known as a day of remembrance for additional significant events which coincidentally or intentionally occurred on June 28:

 Serbian declaration of war against the Ottoman Empire in 1876
 Signing of the Austro–Serbian Alliance of 1881
 Assassination of the Austro-Hungarian crown prince, Franz Ferdinand by Gavrilo Princip in 1914 which triggered the First World War
 Signing of the Treaty of Versailles in 1919
 The Serbian King Alexander I's proclamation of the new 1921 Constitution of the Kingdom of Serbs, Croats and Slovenes, known thereafter as the Vidovdan Constitution (Vidovdanski ustav).
 The Cominform is published in 1948, on the initiative of its Soviet delegates

After 1918, the Yugoslav government designated Vidovdan as a day of remembrance to honor all those who died in war, particularly those of the Balkan Wars and World War I. On the 600th anniversary of the battle of Kosovo, Serbian leader Slobodan Milošević delivered the Gazimestan speech on the site of the battle. This was the first public celebration of Vidovdan since the Yugoslav communist era.

Beginning in the late 19th century, Serbian publications began to appear in Serbian literature promoting the idea that the holiday originated from the Slavic god Svetovit. The first to put forth such a view was Natko Nodilo, who attributed the cult of Svetovit to all Slavs, whose worship in Serbia was later deliberately replaced by that of a saint with a similar name. This view was supported by some later researchers. However, it is generally believed that the cult of Svetovit existed only among the Polabian Slavs and that Vidovdan has nothing to do with this god, and that linking the deity to the holiday is a creation of romanticism.

References

Sources 

 
 
 

 Šijaković, Bogoljub. "The Great War, ethics of Vidovdan, memory." Zbornik Matice srpske za drustvene nauke 150 (2015): 1–42.

External links 

 News articles
 
 
 

Serbian traditions
Serb traditions
Remembrance days
June observances
Vitus
Observances in Serbia
Summer events in Serbia